Charles Alden Black (March 6, 1919 – August 4, 2005) was an American businessman known for his work in aquaculture and oceanography as well as his marriage to Shirley Temple.

Career
He served in the Navy during World War II as an intelligence officer in the South Pacific. He again served during the Korean War as an intelligence officer. After World War II he received his MBA from Stanford in 1946. Then in the late 1950s he lived in Hawaii, working as an executive for Castle & Cooke and Dole Pineapple companies. By the end of the Korean War, he was a lieutenant commander.

Black was an executive at the Stanford Research Institute (now known as SRI International) from 1952 to 1957 and with Ampex Corp from 1957 to 1965. In the 1960s, Black gravitated to what would become the bulk of his life's work—aquaculture and oceanography. He co-founded a hatchery for oysters and abalone and later created Mardela Corp., a fishery and hatchery company headquartered in Burlingame, California, which conducted ventures such as catfish and salmon farming. He later served as a consultant on maritime issues and served as a regent for Santa Clara University.

Personal
He was married to the legendary former child actress and diplomat Shirley Temple from December 16, 1950, until his death. He died from myelodysplastic syndrome on August 4, 2005, at his home in Woodside, California, at the age of 86. They had a son, Charles Alden Black Jr., and two daughters, Susan (from Shirley's previous marriage) and Lori Black.

References

1919 births
2005 deaths
Deaths from myelodysplastic syndrome
Stanford University alumni
Harvard Business School alumni
American food industry businesspeople
SRI International people
People from Santa Monica, California
People from Woodside, California
Military personnel from California
Hotchkiss School alumni
United States Navy personnel of World War II
Shirley Temple